{{DISPLAYTITLE:C21H24O6}}
The molecular formula C21H24O6 (molar mass: 372.41 g/mol, exact mass: 372.1573 u) may refer to:

 Arctigenin
 6',7'-Dihydroxybergamottin

Molecular formulas